Eme Okoro is a Nigerian politician of the People's Democratic Party who currently serves as the Secretary to the State Government in Abia State after he was appointed by Okezie Ikpeazu on 3 June 2015 succeeding Mkpa Agu Mkpa.

See also
Abia State Government

References

Living people
Igbo politicians
Year of birth missing (living people)